Benjamin is a 2018 black comedy film about drug addiction directed by Bob Saget. It was the first film distributed exclusively by Redbox as well as Saget’s final directorial effort prior to his death in January 2022.

Saget cast himself as the patriarch of a family that includes a teen troubled by drug addiction.  The cast includes Rob Corddry, Mary Lynn Rajskub, Kevin Pollak, Peri Gilpin, Dave Foley, Cheri Oteri, Max Burkholder, Clara Mamet, David Hull, Jonny Weston, and James Preston Rogers.

Saget has offered parallels between the character he portrays in his film and Danny Tanner, the character he played on Full House and Fuller House.

The film premiered at the Beverly Hills Film Festival.

Cast

 Bob Saget as Ed
 Rob Corddry as Dr. Ed
 Mary Lynn Rajskub as Jeanette
 Peri Gilpin as Marley
 Cheri Oteri as Clarice
 Max Burkholder as Benjamin
 Clara Mamet as Amber
 David Hull as Ronny
 Jonny Weston as Tom
 James Preston Rogers as Ulf
 Dave Foley as Mitch
 Kevin Pollak as Rick

References

External links 
 
 

2018 films
2018 black comedy films
American black comedy films
Films directed by Bob Saget
2010s English-language films
2010s American films